Nathaniel Philip Victor James Rothschild (born 12 July 1971) is a British-born financier who settled in Switzerland, and a member of the Rothschild family. He is the chairman of Volex plc, a UK-listed manufacturer. He has a wide range of international business interests.

He is the heir apparent to the title of Baron Rothschild, held by his father Jacob Rothschild, 4th Baron Rothschild. Rothschild is also a naturalised Montenegrin citizen.

Early life and education 
Nathaniel Philip Rothschild is the youngest of four children and only son and heir apparent of Jacob Rothschild, 4th Baron Rothschild, and Serena Mary Dunn. His mother was from a Christian background, while his father is Jewish (Rothschild's paternal grandfather was born into a Jewish family, while Rothschild's paternal grandmother had converted to Judaism upon marriage). His maternal grandparents were Sybil Fane, Countess of Westmorland (born Lady Mary Sybil St. Clair-Erskine, daughter of James St Clair-Erskine, 5th Earl of Rosslyn) and Sir Philip Gordon Dunn, 2nd Baronet, whose father was the Canadian financier and tycoon Sir James Dunn.

He was educated at Colet Court (in the same year as former Chancellor of the Exchequer George Osborne), Eton College and Wadham College, Oxford, where he read history, gaining an upper second. Rothschild was a member of the Bullingdon Club as an undergraduate, at the same time as Osborne. He completed an MSc degree in Addiction Studies at the Institute of Psychiatry, King's College London in 2013. In 2018, he was elected as a foundation fellow of Wadham College, Oxford.

Career 
After graduating, Rothschild joined fund manager Lazard's, then went to work at Gleacher, the corporate finance firm now owned by NatWest. In 2000, he occupied a variety of positions, and holds a 50%, in NR Atticus, Atticus Management and Atticus Capital, a hedge fund, which in year 2000 controlled funds approaching £312m.

Rothschild is the former chairman of Vivarte, a pan-European retailer and owner of the Kookai clothing brand. Appointed in 2000 following NR Atticus's acquisition of a 32.9% stake in what was widely regarded as the first hostile proxy fight in France, he led the group through its successful restructuring and subsequent sale to PAI Partners, a French private equity firm in 2004.

He became an alternate director of RIT Capital Partners plc in March 2000, and a full non-executive director in 2004 until 2010 when he stepped down from the RIT board. He remains a substantial direct shareholder of RIT and a 35% beneficial shareholder of Five Arrows Limited, a Rothschild holding company whose major asset is shares in RIT.

Rothschild is a former member of the Belfer Center's International Council at Harvard's John F. Kennedy School of Government and the International Advisory Council of the Brookings Institution. He was also a member of the International Advisory Board of the Barrick Gold Corporation until 2013.

Investments 
In 2000, The Observer wrote that, in addition to Rothschild's then declared inheritance of £500 million, his actual inheritance "hidden in a series of trusts in Switzerland is rumoured to be worth £40bn". Via NR Investments Ltd., his principal investment company, Rothschild was a cornerstone investor in the United Company RUSAL initial public offering in January 2010. At the same time he bought $40 million of Glencore bonds convertible into shares upon an IPO.

NR Investments is also the largest shareholder (26.5% as of 2009) of Volex, a Manchester-based electrical cable maker. Furthermore, Rothschild has an interest in various property developments in Eastern Europe (Montenegro, Romania and Ukraine).

In July 2010, Vallar Plc, a Jersey-incorporated investment vehicle Rothschild founded, raised £707.2 million in an Initial public offering on the London Stock Exchange. Vallar is led by Rothschild and James Campbell, a former Anglo American PLC coal and base metals chief.

In November 2010, Vallar announced it was buying stakes for $3bn in two listed Indonesia thermal coal (used for power stations) producers for a combination of cash and new Vallar shares, with a view to combining them to create the largest exporter of thermal coal to China, India, and the other emerging economies of Asia. The transaction closed as planned on 8 April 2011 and Vallar plc was renamed Bumi plc in the same month. The deal was handled in a joint venture with the Bakrie family (43%) and Rosan Roeslani (25%). In September 2012 the investigation of possible financial irregularities in its Indonesian arm resulted in a 14% fall in its share price. and the much-delayed financial results for 2012 showed a $200 million black hole. It was also reported in 2013 that Rosan Roeslani, a former director of the company, had stolen $173 million from it. In December 2013 the company changed its name to Asia Resource Minerals. In June 2015, following a series of disputes with his co-investors, Rothschild abandoned his investment in the company, selling his 17.2 per cent stake to Coal Energy Ventures.

In June 2011, Rothschild and Tony Hayward, the former chief executive of BP plc, listed a successor vehicle to Vallar called Vallares (LSE:VLRS) on the London Stock Exchange, raising $2.2 billion. Essentially, this was identical in every respect to the first vehicle, which was metals and mining focused, except that the new entity would acquire oil & gas assets. In September 2011, Vallares announced a 50/50 all stock merger with Turkish Energy Champion Genel Energy, valued at $4.2 billion.

Personal life 
In 1994, he married socialite and model Annabelle Neilson; they divorced in 1997. She died in July 2018.

In August 2016, Rothschild married Loretta Basey, a former model who had been featured on page 3 of UK tabloid newspaper The Sun, in Switzerland. Rothschild lived for a time in New York before settling in Switzerland in 2000, and according to the Swiss business magazine Bilanz, he is a resident of Klosters in Graubünden. In 2015, his four-storey townhouse in the West Village was put up for sale for $17.5 million.

The racehorse Nathaniel, winner of the 2011 King George VI and Queen Elizabeth Stakes, was bred and owned by Rothschild's mother and is named after him.

Controversies 
In October 2008, he was the subject of much press speculation when it was revealed that Labour politician Peter Mandelson and the Russian aluminium tycoon Oleg Deripaska (RUSAL) had met when staying on a yacht moored near Corfu, in order to attend a party held by Rothschild. After speculation that this might constitute a conflict of interest for Mandelson, Rothschild wrote a letter to The Times alleging that another guest was Conservative Shadow-Chancellor George Osborne, who, Rothschild said, illicitly tried to solicit a donation from the Russian for his party.

Rothschild has been linked to the son of former Libyan leader Muammar Gaddafi, Saif al-Islam Gaddafi.

In February 2012 he lost his libel case with the Daily Mail who had accused him of being a "puppet master" in reporting about his foreign trips with Peter Mandelson.

References

External links 
 "The Man Who May Become the Richest Rothschild", The New York Times, 9 March 2007
Hon. Nathaniel Philip Victor James Rothschild's entry in Who's Who

1971 births
Living people
People educated at Colet Court
People educated at Eton College
Alumni of Wadham College, Oxford
Alumni of King's College London
Barrick Gold
British businesspeople
Eldest sons of British hereditary barons
Harvard Kennedy School people
Nathaniel Philip Rothschild
British people of Scottish descent
British people of Canadian descent
British people of German-Jewish descent
British Ashkenazi Jews
Montenegrin businesspeople
Bullingdon Club members